In mathematics, particularly in the subfields of set theory and topology, a set  is said to be saturated with respect to a function  if  is a subset of 's domain  and if whenever  sends two points  and  to the same value then  belongs to  (that is, if  then ). Said more succinctly, the set  is called saturated if  

In topology, a subset of a topological space  is saturated if it is equal to an intersection of open subsets of  In a T1 space every set is saturated.

Definition

Preliminaries

Let  be a map. 
Given any subset  define its  under  to be the set:
 
and define its  or  under  to be the set:

Given   is defined to be the preimage:

Any preimage of a single point in 's codomain  is referred to as

Saturated sets

A set  is called  and is said to be  if  is a subset of 's domain  and if any of the following equivalent conditions are satisfied: 

 
 There exists a set  such that 
 Any such set  necessarily contains  as a subset and moreover, it will also necessarily satisfy the equality  where  denotes the image of 
 If  and  satisfy  then 
 For every  the intersection  is equal to the empty set  or to

Examples

Let  be any function. If  is  set then its preimage  under  is necessarily an -saturated set. In particular, every fiber of a map  is an -saturated set. 

The empty set  and the domain  are always saturated. Arbitrary unions of saturated sets are saturated, as are arbitrary intersections of saturated sets.

Properties

Let  and  be any sets and let  be any function. 

If    is -saturated then

If  is -saturated then

where note, in particular, that  requirements or conditions were placed on the set 

See also

References

 
  
  

Basic concepts in set theory
General topology
Operations on sets